Julia Paulina Sofie Spetsmark (born 30 June 1989) is a Swedish professional footballer who plays for FC Fleury 91 in the Division 1 Féminine.

Club career
Spetsmark made her debut in the Swedish Damallsvenskan in 2006 for Mallbackens IF at the age of 17 and has made over 100 appearances in the league. She played in the UEFA Women's Champions League for KIF Örebro in 2015. After spending four years playing for KIF Örebro DFF,

Manchester City 
Spetsmark signed with Manchester City in the FA WSL, in January 2017.

Djurgården 
After Manchester City season, Spetsmark returned to the Damallsvenskan, signing with Djurgården on 23 July 2018 where she scored 6 goals and had 2 assists in 11 games.

North Carolina Courage 
On 7 January 2019 the North Carolina Courage announced that they had acquired Spetsmark. Spetsmark made her NWSL debut and scored her first Courage goal in a 5–0 win over Orlando Pride on 17 April 2019.

Benfica 
On 24 January 2020, Spetsmark signed with Portuguese club Benfica. She made her debut with the club in a 3–1 win over Braga in Taça da Liga Feminina on 1 February.

International career
Spetsmark got her first senior cap when Sweden played Iran at Gamla Ullevi, Gothenburg, in October 2016. She was selected for the Sweden squad for the UEFA Women's Euro 2017.

Honours 
North Carolina Courage
 NWSL Champions: 2019
 NWSL Shield: 2019
Benfica
 Taça da Liga: 2019–20

References

External links 
 
 

1989 births
Living people
Swedish women's footballers
QBIK players
Sunnanå SK players
KIF Örebro DFF players
Manchester City W.F.C. players
Damallsvenskan players
Women's Super League players
Women's association football midfielders
Sweden women's international footballers
National Women's Soccer League players
North Carolina Courage players
Campeonato Nacional de Futebol Feminino players
S.L. Benfica (women) footballers
Expatriate women's footballers in Portugal
FC Fleury 91 (women) players
UEFA Women's Euro 2017 players